South Casco is an unincorporated village in the town of Casco, Cumberland County, Maine, United States. The community is located along U.S. Route 302 and Maine State Route 35 near the town's border with Raymond and the north shore of Sebago Lake. South Casco has a post office with ZIP code 04077.

References

Villages in Cumberland County, Maine
Villages in Maine